William Shu (born December 1979) is a UK-based American businessman, the co-founder and CEO of Deliveroo, an online food delivery company with operations spread across more than 200 cities in 11 countries.

Early life and education
He was born in December 1979, in Connecticut, to Taiwanese parents. In 2001, Shu earned a bachelor's degree from Northwestern University. His first job was with Morgan Stanley in London as an investment banking analyst in 2001. Shu returned to the United States in 2010 to attend business school and received an MBA from Wharton Business School in 2012.

Career
Before founding Deliveroo, Shu worked as analyst for S.A.C. Capital Advisors and ESO Capital, and as an investment banker at Morgan Stanley. He founded Deliveroo in 2013 with childhood friend and software engineer Greg Orlowski. Shu had the idea to start Deliveroo while working in Morgan Stanley's London office and seeing the lack of delivery options while working late nights. Shu worked as the company's first delivery person, delivering food every day for the first eight months in order to understand the customer experience.

Deliveroo operated in London for the first two years, growing via word of mouth. In 2015, the company expanded internationally to Paris, Berlin and Dublin. Deliveroo reached a valuation of more than £1.5 billion in November 2017, operating in 12 countries and more than 150 cities.

In February 2016, Orlowski, who had been working as Deliveroo's chief technology officer, left "to spend more time with his wife in Chicago after the birth of their daughter".

Shu famously continues to work shifts as a Deliveroo driver, delivering food around London every few weeks.

Controversy 
Shu received criticism for raising his personal salary to £125,000 a year, a 22.5% increase, amidst a dispute over riders' status and company losses in 2016. Administrative expenses, such as hiring new staff and a new London office, multiplied from £28.8m to £142.2m, resulting in a large loss. In addition, Shu gave out close to £4.5m in share bonuses to directors and hundreds of other head office staff.

Deliveroo was one of many gig economy companies facing legal challenges over the employment model of its delivery riders. Four court judgements, most recently a Court of Appeal’s judgement in 2021, confirmed that Deliveroo’s riders are self-employed independent contractors.

Personal life
Shu lives in London.

References

1979 births
Living people
People from Notting Hill
American expatriates in England
American investment bankers
Morgan Stanley employees
Businesspeople from Connecticut
American chief executives
American people of Taiwanese descent
Northwestern University alumni
American company founders
Wharton School of the University of Pennsylvania alumni
American chief executives of food industry companies
Businesspeople from London